Mason High School is a public high school located in Mason, Texas (USA). It is part of the Mason Independent School District located in central Mason County and classified as a 2A school by the UIL. In 2015, the school was rated "Met Standard" by the Texas Education Agency.

Athletics
The Mason Punchers compete in the following sports 

Baseball
Basketball
Cross Country
Football
Golf
Softball
Tennis
Track and Field

State Titles
Football - 
2011(1A/D1)
2018 (2A/D1)
One Act Play - 
1966(2A)
2014(1A)
2015(2A)
2016(2A)
2022(2A)

State finalists
One Act Play 
2013 (1A) First Runner up 
2017 (2A) Second Runner up
2018 (2A) First Runner up
2021 (2A) Second Runner up 
Football - 
2014(2A/D1)

References

External links
Mason ISD

Schools in Mason County, Texas
Public high schools in Texas